Bebearia kiellandi is a butterfly in the family Nymphalidae. It is found in north-western Tanzania. The habitat consists of forests.

Adults are attracted to fermenting bananas.

References

Butterflies described in 1993
kiellandi
Endemic fauna of Tanzania
Butterflies of Africa